Bertem is a municipality located in the Belgian province of Flemish Brabant. The municipality comprises the towns of Bertem proper, Korbeek-Dijle and Leefdaal. On January 1, 2006, Bertem had a total population of 9,215. The total area is 29.75 km² which gives a population density of 310 inhabitants per km².

The area is noted for its rural landscape, in particular the "Koeheide" and "Bertembos" ("Bertem Forest"). On the open plains of Leefdaal, it is possible to see the endangered European Hamster (Cricetus cricetus)).

Known cyclist Vlad van Mechelen is from there.

See also
 List of municipalities of the Flemish Region

References

External links 
 
 
 VC. Bertem-Leefdaal, the local soccer club of Bertem
 Gazetteer Entry

Municipalities of Flemish Brabant